Artiifact (stylized as ARTIIFACT) is the debut studio album by South African hip hop record producer and musician Anatii. The album was released on 9 September 2016 by his record label YAL Entertainment, after many delays and following singles "Freedom" and "The Saga", which were released in 2014 and early 2015, respectively. The album was initially titled Electronic Bushman.

Promotion 
In promotion of his debut studio release, Anatii commenced celebrations with an album release party at Moloko Club in Hatfield, east of Pretoria on 9 September 2016.

Anatii hosted the ARTIIFACT Tour, which had dates for shows in Midrand and Durban on 30 September and 2 October 2016, respectively. The tour featured main opening act, American singer, friend and collaborator Omarion.

Track listing

References 

2016 debut albums
Anatii albums